Electric Dirt is the final studio album from American musician Levon Helm, released in 2009. It is the follow-up to his Grammy-winning 2007 album Dirt Farmer. In Uncuts list of the 150 best albums between 2000 through 2009, Electric Dirt was listed 80th. It won the first ever Grammy Award for Best Americana Album, an inaugural category in 2010. The track "Growin' Trade", cowritten with Larry Campbell, was Helm's first cowritten song since his debut solo album, Levon Helm & the RCO All-Stars.

Track listing
"Tennessee Jed" (Jerry Garcia, Robert Hunter) – 5:58
"Move Along Train" (Roebuck Staples) – 3:22
"Growin' Trade" (Levon Helm, Larry Campbell) – 4:22
"Golden Bird" (Happy Traum) – 5:11
"Stuff You Gotta Watch" (Muddy Waters) – 3:38
"White Dove" (Carter Stanley) – 3:29
"Kingfish" (Randy Newman) – 4:24
"You Can’t Lose What You Ain’t Never Had" (Muddy Waters) – 4:01
"When I Go Away" (Larry Campbell) – 4:32
"Heaven’s Pearls" (Anthony Leone, Byron Isaacs, Fiona McBain, Amy Helm, Glenn Patscha) – 4:09
"I Wish I Knew How It Would Feel to Be Free" (Richard Carroll Lamp, Willy E. Taylor) – 3:25
iTunes only bonus track
"That's Alright" (Arthur Crudup) – 4:53

Productions notes
Cover art conception: Levon Helm
Cover art production: Michael (Mike) DuBois
Photos: Ahron R. Foster
Layout and design: Carrie Smith

References

2009 albums
Albums produced by Larry Campbell (musician)
Covers albums
Levon Helm albums
Vanguard Records albums
Grammy Award for Best Americana Album